Karnataka Administrative Service (KAS) is the civil service of Karnataka state in India. The Public Service Commission conducts exams to recruit candidates for the service. These young officers recruited by KPSC take up various administrative posts at the district and state level. At the start they play the role of Sub Divisional Magistrate and, on promotion, Additional District Magistrates. After promotion to IAS, they take up various key positions at the district level as Deputy Commissioners and also equivalent IAS cadre jobs at the state level.

KAS Exams Education Qualification 
Candidate must hold a Bachelor’s degree of a University incorporated by an Act of the Central or State Legislature in India

The total number of attempts in the KPSC KAS Exam 
GM - 05 times

Category-1, 2A, 2B, 3A, 3B - 07 times

SC,ST - unlimited

See also
Kerala Administrative Service

References

External links
 
 KAS Syllabus

Government of Karnataka
State civil services of India